The San Jose Apaches were a professional American football team based in San Jose, California. The Apaches were formed as a semi-professional team in 1962 and were members of the Northern California Semi-Pro Football League and Pacific Football League (sometimes known as the Pacific Coast Football League). In 1967 the Apaches and other members of the Pacific league joined the Continental Football League as the new Pacific Division. Their head coach and general manager for the 1967 season was future Pro Football Hall of Famer Bill Walsh. Walsh led the Apaches to 2nd place in the Pacific Division.

Prior to the start of the 1968 COFL season the Apaches ceased all football operations.

Season-by-season

References

Continental Football League teams
Defunct American football teams in California
Apaches
American football teams established in 1962
American football teams disestablished in 1968
1962 establishments in California
1968 disestablishments in California